Ned Francis Bolcar (born January 12, 1967) is a former American football linebacker. He played three seasons in the National Football League (NFL), one with the Seattle Seahawks and two with the Miami Dolphins.

A native of Lopatcong Township, New Jersey who played at Phillipsburg High School, Bolcar was a 1984 USA Today High School All-American selection.

He played college football at the University of Notre Dame, where he was a two-time second-team All-American (1987, 1989), and captained the 1988 national championship team.

Bolcar was a sixth-round selection in the 1990 NFL Draft by the Seattle Seahawks.

References 

1967 births
Living people
Phillipsburg High School (New Jersey) alumni
Sportspeople from Warren County, New Jersey
People from Lopatcong Township, New Jersey
People from Phillipsburg, New Jersey
American football linebackers
Notre Dame Fighting Irish football players
Seattle Seahawks players
Miami Dolphins players